Juan Pablo Guzmán (born August 31, 1988) is a Colombian soccer player. He mainly operates as a defensive midfielder.

Career

Youth and college
Guzmán attended Charlotte Latin School, where he was member of the NSCAA/Adidas youth All-America team while leading his team to a state championship in 2004. Guzmán went on to play four years of college soccer at Liberty University, where he was twice selected to NSCAA All-South Atlantic Region team as a sophomore in 2007 and as a junior in 2008.

During his college years Guzmán also played for the Southern California Seahorses in the USL Premier Development League.

Professional
Guzmán turned professional in 2010 when he signed for USL Second Division side Charlotte Eagles. He made his professional debut for them on July 3, in a game against Harrisburg City Islanders.

He scored his first goal for Louisville City FC in Slugger Field v Rochester Rhinos on April 16, 2015.

His contract with Louisville City was terminated by mutual consent on January 28, 2016 so that he could sign with Colombian side Patriotas F.C.

Career statistics

References

External links
 Liberty bio
 2006 Liberty Flame's Stats
 2007 Liberty Flame's Stats
 2008 Liberty Flame's Stats
 2009 Liberty Flame's Stats

1988 births
Living people
American soccer players
Association football midfielders
Charlotte Eagles players
Liberty Flames men's soccer players
Louisville City FC players
New Mexico United players
Soccer players from Charlotte, North Carolina
Southern California Seahorses players
USL Championship players
USL League Two players
USL Second Division players